Adolf Ivar Arwidsson (7 August 1791 – 21 June 1858) was a Finnish political journalist, writer and historian. His writing was critical of Finland's status at the time as a Grand Duchy under the Russian Tsars. Its sharpness cost him his job as a lecturer at The Royal Academy of Turku and he had to emigrate to Sweden, where he continued his political activity. The Finnish national movement considered Arwidsson the mastermind of an independent Finland.

Life 
Adolf Ivar Arwidsson was born in 1791 in Padasjoki in southern Finland. His father, a chaplain, later moved the family to Laukaa in mid-Finland. Laukaa was severely affected by the Finnish war of 1808–1809, and Arwidsson was left facing life under the Russian Empire, to which Finland now an belonged as an autonomous Grand Duchy. In 1809, while still at high school in Porvoo, Arwidsson was a representative at the Diet of Porvoo, at which the Finnish estates swore oaths of allegiance to the Tsars. Enabling support from the Swedish speaking upper strata of the Finnish society for a separate Finnish identity was expressed by the university docent A. I. Arwidsson (1791–1858) in a phrase that, somewhat modified, became an often quoted Fennoman credo: "Swedes we are no longer, Russians we do not want to become, let us therefore be Finns." (Swedish form: "Svenskar äro vi icke längre, ryssar vilja vi icke bli, låt oss alltså vara finnar" Finnish form: "Ruotsalaisia emme enää ole, venäläisiksi emme tahdo tulla, olkaamme siis suomalaisia.")
In 1814 the Royal Academy of Turku awarded him his Magister degree in philosophy. In 1817 the same institution awarded him his doctorate, and he became a lecturer at the academy. Arwidsson's native language was Swedish; all his works are in Swedish, though he was a fluent speaker of Finnish.

After his dissertation Arwidsson spent a year in Sweden. During this time he made contact with the exiled Finns in Uppsala and Stockholm.  In 1820 after his return Arwidsson, who had so far written lyric poetry, submitted for publication a political text whose sharp and radical tone soon ensured attention in the capital, Saint Petersburg.  Finally, as a consequence, in 1822 he lost his position as a lecturer and was banished from the university.  Cut off from his training in his chosen career, in 1823 Arwidsson emigrated to Stockholm, where in 1825 he gained his civil rights, and found work as a librarian in the royal library.

In 1827 Arwidsson undertook a research trip to Finland, but was immediately deported back to Sweden by the authorities. This experience led to a further radicalisation of his political work, and as a result he participated in several public debates in Sweden, in each of which he represented the situation in Finland in a dark light, but at the same time tried to portray the Finnish-national identity positively. Apart from his political work, Arwidsson also produced several historical research works. In 1843 he was appointed director of the royal library. In the same year he was allowed to travel to Finland, but he only took advantage of this possibility in 1858, when he undertook a round trip through Finland. During this journey Arwidsson caught pneumonia, and died on 21 June in Viipuri. He was buried in his childhood home town of Laukaa. The following verses written by Elias Lönnrot were later carved onto his gravestone:

Academic works 
Svenska fornsånger ("Old Swedish Songs", 1834–42)
Förteckning öfver Kongl. Bibliothekets i Stockholm Isländska Handskrifter ("Inventory of the Icelandic Manuscripts in the Royal Library of Stockholm", 1848)

Political works 
The political works of Adolf Ivar Arwidssons form two main phases. The first is his time as a lecturer in Turku.  The second period of intensive political activity followed after his emigration to Sweden, where Arwidsson participated intensively in the debate over the situation of his homeland.

References 

 Liisa Castrén: Adolf Ivar Arwidsson – Nuori Arwidsson ja hänen ympäristönsä. Otava, Helsinki 1944.
 Liisa Castrén: Adolf Ivar Arwidsson isänmaallisena herättäjänä. Suomen Historiallinen Seura, Helsinki 1951.
 Olavi Junnila: Ruotsiin muuttanut Adolf Iwar Arwidsson ja Suomi. Suomen Historiallinen Seura, Helsinki 1972.
 Kari Tarkiainen: Adolf Ivar Arwidsson, in Matti Klinge (Hrsg.): Suomen kansallisbiografia 1. SKS, Helsinki 2003, .

1791 births
1858 deaths
People from Padasjoki
Finnish emigrants to Sweden
19th-century Finnish politicians
19th-century Finnish journalists
Finnish folk-song collectors
Deaths from pneumonia in Finland
19th-century musicologists